Kutob is a 2005 Filipino suspense horror film directed by Jose Javier Reyes; the title translates into "foreboding" in English. The film was a box office success in the Philippines, with both Reyes and Agustin also winning the Best Director and Best Actor awards respectively at the 2005 Metro Manila Film Festival; the film itself came third at the festival. The film contains elements of horror and the supernatural without being overtly of those genres, drawing comparisons in places to two US films; namely, Psycho and Carrie.

Plot Summary
Erica (Rica Peralejo) is having problems with her boyfriend Carlo (Ryan Agoncillo), whom she suspects of womanizing. She and her best friend, Mayen (Alessandra de Rossi), consult a fortune-teller who warns about danger that lurks ahead. When Erica ignores this, her relationship with Carlo worsens then her friends Amy (Ana Capri) and Lemuel (Marvin Agustin) intervenes. Erica tries to patch things up with Carlo but Lemuel, who is protecting a hidden desire for her, also has some things to finish.

Cast

Main Cast
Rica Peralejo as Erica
Marvin Agustin as Lemuel
Alessandra de Rossi as Mayen
Ryan Agoncillo as Carlo

Supporting Cast
James Blanco as RJ
Liza Lorena as Guada
Ana Capri as Amy
Bing Loyzaga as Rowena
Andrea del Rosario as Sandra
Valerie Concepcion as Tet
Eugene Domingo as Salve
John Wayne Sace as young Lemuel

Awards

See also
 List of ghost films

References

External links

[g-philippines-movie-review/ Kutob - Movie Review at Flix Unlimited

2005 films
2005 horror films
Philippine horror films
Philippine slasher films
Films directed by José Javier Reyes